Hellas Verona F.C. came back strongly following its disappointing defense of the 1985 Serie A crown, with a fourth place and European qualification. A notable signing prior to the season was former World Cup hero Paolo Rossi, who spent his final footballing season at Hellas, scoring four goals.

Squad

Goalkeepers
  Giuliano Giuliani
  Stefano Vavoli

Defenders
  Luigi De Agostini
  Mauro Ferroni
  Silvano Fontolan
  Fabio Marangon
  Roberto Tricella

Midfielders
  Luciano Bruni
  Antonio Di Gennaro
  Roberto Galia
  Mauro Roberto
  Luigi Sacchetti
  Walter Ugolini
  Vinicio Verza
  Domenico Volpati
  Vittorino Zinelli

Attackers
  Preben Elkjær
  Ferdinando Gasparini
  Marco Pacione
  Paolo Rossi

Competitions

Serie A

League table

Matches

Topscorers
  Preben Elkjær 8
  Roberto Galia 5
  Vinicio Verza 5
  Paolo Rossi 4

Coppa Italia

Eightfinals

References

Hellas Verona F.C. seasons
Verona